The Allen-Barringer House, now located about  southwest of West Monroe, Louisiana, was built in around 1906 in the town of West Monroe.  It was moved to its present location in 1973 in order to save the house.  The house was listed on the National Register of Historic Places in 1982.

The house has Colonial Revival and Queen Anne Revival features.  In the move the original chimneys were lost and replaced, and one of its four Ionic columns of its portico was missing, but the house was deemed to have good historical integrity.

References

Houses on the National Register of Historic Places in Louisiana
Colonial Revival architecture in Louisiana
Houses completed in 1906
Ouachita Parish, Louisiana
1906 establishments in Louisiana